Veronika Lochbrunner (born 2 December 1978) is a German former sailor. She competed in the Yngling event at the 2004 Summer Olympics.

References

External links
 

1978 births
Living people
German female sailors (sport)
Olympic sailors of Germany
Sailors at the 2004 Summer Olympics – Yngling
People from Lindau
Sportspeople from Swabia (Bavaria)